Teresa Marlene Chafin (born October 4, 1955) is a justice of the Supreme Court of Virginia.

Education

Chafin is a native of Russell County and the sister of the late state senator Ben Chafin. She received her undergraduate degree from Emory and Henry College and her Juris Doctor from the University of Richmond School of Law in 1987 and was admitted to the practice of law in 1988.

Virginia Court of Appeals and state court service

She was sworn in on June 18, 2012. Prior to her service on the appellate court, Chafin had a private practice based in Lebanon, and sat as Circuit Court judge, primarily in Tazewell County, Virginia from 2005 until 2012, including service as the chief judge of the 29th Circuit in 2008 and 2009. From 2002 until 2005, Judge Chafin served as Tazewell County's Juvenile & Domestic Relations District Court judge. She left office on September 1, 2019, upon her elevation to the Supreme Court of Virginia.

Supreme Court of Virginia

On February 14, 2019, she was unanimously elected by the Virginia General Assembly to be a justice of the Supreme Court of Virginia, replacing Elizabeth A. McClanahan who retired on September 1, 2019.

References

1955 births
Living people
21st-century American judges
Judges of the Court of Appeals of Virginia
People from Lebanon, Virginia
University of Richmond alumni
Justices of the Supreme Court of Virginia
21st-century American women judges
Emory and Henry College alumni